Woman's Weekly is a British women's magazine published by Future plc and edited by Geoffrey Palmer.  On sale every Wednesday, Woman’s Weekly sells over 240,000 copies per week.

Background
Launched in 1911 by Amalgamated Press, Woman’s Weekly has been a successful magazine title for over 100 years.  Woman's Weekly focuses on the home, family and lives of grown-up women, providing them with health advice and hints on how to feel good at any age.  Featuring beauty and fashion advice which is age-relevant, it aims to give women the confidence to experiment by adapting the latest trends to suit them.

Woman's Weekly aims to inspire readers to be creative with cookery, home, gardening and craft ideas.  Each week also features a fiction story and generally upbeat real-life stories. Woman’s Weekly says it is “the grown-up woman’s guide to modern living”.

On 4 November 2011 the magazine celebrated its 100th anniversary with a special exact facsimile re-publication of the first edition. Discussing the longevity of the magazine, on the BBC Radio 4's Today programme, then editor Diane Kenwood and social historian Dr Clare Rose explained that the magazine had been launched in 1911 to appeal to the growing class of office-employed women who sought a magazine for reading on their daily commute by train, tram and bus.

Payment terms
In June 2018 writer Tara Westgate alleged that Woman's Weekly had cut its payment for short stories by one third (from £150 per 2,000 word story to £100) and required all rights including moral rights (ie the right to be identified as the author of the story) in return for this payment.  Carol Bevitt wrote an article on the subject for Writing magazine in the 2 August issue, while Joanne Harris blogged and Tweeted on the story.

References

External links
Woman's Weekly

1911 establishments in the United Kingdom
Women's magazines published in the United Kingdom
Weekly magazines published in the United Kingdom
Magazines established in 1911
Magazines published in London